John Alexander VC (died 24 September 1857) was a British Army soldier and an Irish recipient of the Victoria Cross (VC), the highest award for gallantry in the face of the enemy that can be awarded to a member of the British and Commonwealth forces.

Born in Mullingar, County Westmeath, Alexander was a private in the 90th Perthshire Light Infantry (later known as The Cameronians (Scottish Rifles)), during the Crimean War when the following deed took place for which he was awarded the VC:

On 18 June 1855 after the attack on the Redan at Sebastopol, Alexander went out from the trenches under very heavy fire and brought in several wounded men. On 6 September, when he was with a working party in the most advanced trench, he went out under heavy fire and helped to bring in a captain who was severely wounded.

He was later killed in action during the Siege of Lucknow during the Indian Mutiny in British India on 24 September 1857.

The medal
Private Alexander's Victoria Cross is displayed at the National War Museum of Scotland at Edinburgh Castle in Scotland.

References

External links
 Burial in Lucknow, India

1857 deaths
19th-century Irish people
British Army personnel of the Crimean War
British Army recipients of the Victoria Cross
British military personnel killed in the Indian Rebellion of 1857
Cameronians soldiers
Crimean War recipients of the Victoria Cross
Irish recipients of the Victoria Cross
Irish soldiers in the British Army
People from Mullingar
Year of birth unknown
Recipients of the Médaille militaire (France)
Military personnel from County Westmeath